

The Eagle Helicopter Eagle II and Eagle III were light helicopters developed in the United States in the early 1980s. With side-by-side seating for two, they had an unusual boxy fuselage shaped like a stubby wedge. No anti-torque system was required, since the rotors of both aircraft were powered by tip jets. In the case of the Eagle II, the tip jets were "cold", fed with compressed air generated by an Evinrude piston engine, while the Eagle III's rotor was driven by more conventional propane-burning jets. Development did not progress beyond the construction of a prototype in each configuration.

Specifications (Eagle II)

References
 
 

1980s United States sport aircraft
1980s United States helicopters